In Chinese cuisine, dark soy sauce is a dark-coloured soy sauce used mainly for adding colour and flavour to dishes. It is richer, slightly thicker, and less salty than other types of soy sauce. As the Chinese name  suggests, it is also aged longer. It is often sweetened by adding molasses or other sweetening agents. Dark soy sauce is often used in stews, stir-fries, and sauces. It is used in dishes requiring colours, such as red cooked dishes.

Name 

The Chinese word , meaning "old extract", is shortened from the word , meaning "old man extract".

Dark Soy Sauce Substitutes 
Dark soy sauce is a thick, dark-colored, and slightly sweet soy sauce that is commonly used in Asian cooking. But, If you don't have dark soy sauce on hand, there are some substitutes that you can use:

 Tamari: Tamari is a soy sauce originating in Japan. It is made from fermented soybeans and has a darker color and richer flavor than traditional soy sauce. Tamari is gluten-free, as it is made without wheat, which makes it a popular choice for people with gluten intolerance or celiac disease. It is commonly used as a dipping sauce for sushi, sashimi, and tempura, or as a seasoning for soups, stews, and stir-fries.
 Hoisin sauce: Hoisin sauce is a thick, sweet, and savory sauce that is commonly used in Chinese cuisine. It can be used as a substitute for dark soy sauce but is sweeter and less salty. 
 Light soy sauce: Light soy sauce is the most common substitute for dark soy sauce. It has a similar flavor but is not as thick or sweet.
 Worcestershire Sauce: Worcestershire sauce is a condiment that originated in England. It is made from a blend of vinegar, molasses, sugar, salt, onions, garlic, tamarind, and other spices. The sauce has a complex, savory flavor and is commonly used as a marinade for meats, as a flavoring for soups and stews, or as a topping for steaks and burgers. Worcestershire sauce is also a key ingredient in the famous Bloody Mary cocktail.

See also 
 Soup soy sauce
 Sweet soy sauce

References 

Chinese condiments
Soy sauces